Sisitcanogna is a former  Tongva-Gabrieleño Native American settlement in Los Angeles County, California.

It was located at 'Pear Orchard' in the San Gabriel Valley, possibly in the northeast Pasadena area.

See also
Hahamongna, California
Category: Tongva populated places
Tongva language
Population of Native California

References

History of Pasadena, California
Tongva populated places
San Gabriel Valley
Former settlements in Los Angeles County, California
Former Native American populated places in California
Former populated places in California